South Fellini is an American film, graphic novel and apparel studio established by Tony Trov and Johnny Zito in 2010.

History
Starting in the comic book industry with DC Entertainment's Zuda Comics, South Fellini has also developed graphic novels and films for Image Comics, Comixology, Ford Automotive, Red 5 Comics, and High Treason Pictures.

Trov, Zito, and illustrator Mark A. Fionda Jr. created the limited edition comic Carnivale De Robotique for the  2009 Indy Skip Week. This was expanded into a four book miniseries for Comixology the following year. Carnivale De Robotique features the rebellious "Nanny Droid" Wendy, who runs away to be a ballerina in the robot circus. At this fairground of electronic delights, the character finds love and adventure among other special robots who don't fit in with society.

In 2010, South Fellini began publishing the webcomic D.O.G.S. of Mars on Comixology. This webcomic features astronauts isolated on the planet Mars,
stalked by nocturnal monsters. Lines are drawn and loyalties are tested as dissent grows within the ranks of the crew. Faced with mutiny, death and dishonor; the captain must sacrifice her humanity in order to survive. D.O.G.S. of Mars was published in graphic novel form by Image Comics in 2011.

Following their time in the comic book industry, the duo wrote and directed two feature length horror comedies that were distributed by Gravitas Ventures. 
Alpha Girls and American Exorcist both star actress Falon Joslyn and feature Bill Moseley, Ron Jeremy and Schoolly D.

South Fellini opened their first brick and mortar studio and shop on Passyunk Avenue in South Philadelphia in 2016. In 2019 South Fellini grabbed headlines by opening  a second location in Fashion District Philadelphia that featured the mannequin prop from the 1987 film Mannequin. In 2021 a Free Blockbuster was launched at the Passyunk Avenue shop location.

Comics
DC Entertainment:
Black Cherry Bombshells (2008- 2011)
La Morté Sisters (2009- 2011)

Comixology
Carnivale De Robotique (2010)

Red 5 Comics
Moon Girl (2011- 2013)

Image Comics
D.O.G.S. of Mars (2012)

Films
Fiesta Day- Ford Fiesta short film series
Alpha Girls- 2013
American Exorcist- 2018

Awards
"Outstanding Achievement in Local Comic Art" – 2011 Philadelphia Geek Awards
"Feature Length Indie Film of the Year" – 2012 Philadelphia Geek Awards nomination 
"Makers of the Year" – 2016 Philadelphia Geek Awards

References

External links

Privately held companies based in Pennsylvania
Passyunk Square, Philadelphia